Diamond Alexxis Smith, known professionally as Big Boss Vette is an American rapper from St. Louis, Missouri.

Career 
Big Boss Vette first went viral in 2015 for creating her own version of Dej Loaf's song "Try Me". In 2019, she published her first song, "Dog Ass Nigga". Vette signed to Republic Records after her song "Bad Bitch" saw success on YouTube. In January 2022, Arielle Lana LeJarde of Pitchfork called Vette's song "Heavy" the must-hear song of the day. Her song "Snatched" achieved viral success on the social media application TikTok. XXL called the song a "summer staple".

Personal life 
Vette was shot in 2016 during a fight.

References 

Rappers from St. Louis
American women rappers
21st-century American rappers
Women hip hop musicians
21st-century women rappers
Republic Records artists
Year of birth missing (living people)
Living people